The 1981–82 season was Paris Saint-Germain's 12th season in existence. PSG played their home league games at the Parc des Princes in Paris, registering an average attendance of 24,216 spectators per match. The club was presided by Francis Borelli and the team was coached by Georges Peyroche. Dominique Bathenay was the team captain.

Summary

Georges Peyroche made a few tweaks to the team in 1981–82 with the signings of Raymond Domenech, Michel N'Gom, Daniel Sanchez but above all Yugoslav star Ivica Šurjak. The Parisians mounted a challenge for a European spot via the Division 1, but fell short towards the end of the season with a 7th-place finish. They secured, however, another shot at it by reaching the club's first French Cup final. There were nearly 150,000 requests for only 46,160 seats available at the Parc des Princes to see PSG go up against the great Saint-Étienne of Michel Platini, who was playing his last match in France before leaving for Juventus.

Nambatingue Toko opened the scoring for PSG in the 58th minute following a good cross from Ivica Šurjak. Saint-Étienne reacted and Platini equalized in the 78th minute to send the game to extra-time. Platini then doubled his personal account, giving the Greens the lead in the 99th minute. The Parc des Princes faithful no longer believed in their team when Dominique Rocheteau, after yet another assist from Šurjak, scored an unexpected equalizer against his former team in the last seconds of the match.

PSG fans then invaded the field in joy, while club president Francis Borelli kneeled and kissed the lawn of the Parc. Following an interruption of 30 minutes, the penalty shootout sealed PSG's coronation. Dominique Baratelli stopped Saint-Étienne's last attempt and Jean-Marc Pilorget scored the winning penalty for the capital side. Twelve years into existence, PSG had won their first major title in their home stadium. This success opened PSG the doors to Europe for the first time, qualifying for next season's European Cup Winners' Cup.

Players 

As of the 1981–82 season.

Squad

Out on loan

Transfers 

As of the 1981–82 season.

Arrivals

Departures

Kits 

French radio RTL was the shirt sponsor. French sportswear brand Le Coq Sportif was the kit manufacturer.

Friendly tournaments

Tournoi de Paris

Competitions

Overview

Division 1

League table

Results by round

Matches

Coupe de France

Round of 64

Round of 32

Round of 16

Quarter-finals

Semi-finals

Final

Statistics 

As of the 1981–82 season.

Appearances and goals 

|-
!colspan="16" style="background:#dcdcdc; text-align:center"|Goalkeepers

|-
!colspan="16" style="background:#dcdcdc; text-align:center"|Defenders

|-
!colspan="16" style="background:#dcdcdc; text-align:center"|Midfielders

|-
!colspan="16" style="background:#dcdcdc; text-align:center"|Forwards

|-

References

External links 

Official websites
 PSG.FR - Site officiel du Paris Saint-Germain
 Paris Saint-Germain - Ligue 1 
 Paris Saint-Germain - UEFA.com

Paris Saint-Germain F.C. seasons
Association football clubs 1981–82 season
French football clubs 1981–82 season